Basel Badischer Bahnhof (literally "Basel Baden Railway station", the name referring to the Grand Duchy of Baden State Railways, which built the station) is a railway station situated in the Swiss city of Basel. Although the station is situated in Switzerland, major part of the terrain occupied by it forms an exclave of the European Union Customs Union, whereas the German regulatory rules apply to its railway traffic and infrastructure, the latter owned by the respective German entities. It is listed as a Swiss heritage site of national significance. The station is served by three lines of the tri-national Regio S-Bahn Basel, and ICE and EC/IC lines to and from Freiburg, Karlsruhe, Mannheim, Frankfurt, Hamburg, Berlin and other cities in Germany.

The station is the smaller of the two largest railway stations in Basel, the other being Basel SBB, which is operated by the Swiss Federal Railways (SBB CFF FFS).

History

In March 1838, the Grand Duchy of Baden State Railways started working on a railway line from Mannheim via Heidelberg, Karlsruhe and Freiburg im Breisgau. This line was called Badische Hauptbahn (Baden Main Line) or Rheintalbahn (Rhine Valley Line). A Swiss railway commission desired a continuation of the line into Basel and contacted the Grand Duchy of Baden in 1842.

In January 1851, the Rheintalbahn line reached the village of Haltingen, close to the Swiss border. Since the two governments had not agreed about how to build the station in Basel yet, the passengers were transported across the border with hackney carriages.

Finally, a treaty between the government of Baden and the Swiss Confederation entered into force on July 27, 1852, and has remained so into the present. The start of construction was further delayed, however, by the Swiss insisting on a terminal station and the Badische Staatseisenbahnen insisting on a through station in favour of the planned extension of the line towards Waldshut.

The first Baden Railway station of Basel was built as a through station at nowaday's Messeplatz square about 800 meters west of today's one. The line from Haltingen to Basel was opened on February 19, 1855, with a temporary wooden station building. A further line to Konstanz in Baden was connected to the southern end of the station in 1856, and by April 10, 1859, Switzerland and Baden had finally agreed to build a permanent station, of which the construction started in May. The street entrances of the station building opened to nowaday's Riehenring street. In 1875, the communication railroad to Basel Swiss station was opened, leaving the Baden station together with the railway to Konstanz.

The increase of railway traffic in the beginning of 20th century afforded larger facilities. To get space for the urban development of Kleinbasel, the government of Basel insisted on a new station on a new site. It was chosen straight north northwest of the railway bridge across the Rhine. The station was moved to its current location between 1906 and 1913.

Special customs and regulatory territory

Although the Badischer Bahnhof is located in Switzerland, due to the 1852 treaty between the Swiss Confederation and the Grand Duchy of Baden (one of the predecessors of today's Germany), the terrain under its largest part, encompassing the platforms and part of the passenger tunnel that lead to the German/Swiss customs checkpoint, forms a special customs territory which is both an exclave of the European Union Customs Union and an enclave within Liechtenstein–Switzerland customs union. The shops in the station hall are, however, located in Liechtenstein–Switzerland customs union, and the Swiss franc is used as the official currency there (although the euro is universally accepted). Customs checks are performed in a tunnel between the platforms and the station hall, while passengers of international trains transiting to Basel SBB may be subjected to on-board customs checks. Immigration checks have in turn been abolished since Switzerland joined the Schengen Area in 2008.

Except for the Basel connecting line, all lines served by the station along with traffic on them are under purview of the German Federal Railway Authority and the European Union Agency for Railways, being owned along with the station by the German Bundeseisenbahnvermögen, operated by DB Netz and DB Station&Service, regulated by the German Federal Network Agency and available exclusively for trains operated by German-licensed railway undertakings, including Deutsche Bahn (DB Fernverkehr & DB Regio), ÖBB, Swiss Federal Railways and the Basel S-Bahn.

Layout
Basel Badischer Bahnhof has five side platforms serving ten tracks. The platforms are reached from a passenger tunnel leading from the main station building.

Services
 the following services stop at Basel Badischer Bahnhof:

Long distance services

Regional services

References

External links
 
 
 Station layout (PDF)

Railway stations in Switzerland opened in 1855
Railway stations in Basel-Stadt
Buildings and structures in Basel
Cultural property of national significance in Basel-Stadt
Germany–Switzerland border crossings